This is a list of Mersey Beat number-one singles. Mersey Beat is a former British weekly pop music newspaper. It was founded initially as a regional bi-weekly publication on 13 July 1961. In 1963 it began compiling a Top 20 chart based on around 10 stores and became a national paper.

History
The charts and paper became weekly on 24 April 1964 and, following an investment in September 1964 by Brian Epstein, expanded the chart and sample size to become the first publication to announce a Top 100 on 3 December 1964. On 6 March 1965 the paper was rebranded Music Echo and by 16 April 1966 the chart was no longer published—on 23 April 1966 the newspaper was incorporated into Disc which became Disc and Music Echo.

In the period when Mersey Beat published a chart there was no official singles chart; Record Retailer and the BBC jointly commissioned the British Market Research Bureau (BMRB) chart in February 1969. The first record chart in the United Kingdom was published in November 1952 by NME. The Official Charts Company and Guinness' British Hit Singles & Albums consider this the canonical source for the British singles chart before 10 March 1960 and, after that date, the Record Retailer chart. However, NME continued to compile their own chart and publications Disc and Melody Maker also published charts in this period. Being no universally accepted chart, the BBC used aggregated results of charts from these three publications (and Record Mirror prior to 1952) to compile their own Pick of the Pops chart.

Charts compiled by Mersey Beat had thirteen number-one singles that did not reach top spot in the Record Retailer chart; this included two singles from each of The Who and The Hollies. Notably, "19th Nervous Breakdown" reached number one on the Mersey Beat chart as well as Disc, NME, and Melody Maker charts. It topped the BBC's Pick of the Pops aggregated chart and was announced as number one on Top of the Pops; however, because it did not reach number one on the Record Retailer chart it is omitted from The Official Charts Company's canon.

Number-one singles
Key
 – The song did not reach number one on the Record Retailer chart.
  – The song spent a week at number one where it shared the top spot with another song.

 In April 1966, Mersey Beat was incorporated into Disc; see also List of Disc number-one singles.

Notes

References

Mersey Beat